Abdulghani Muneer (Arabic:عبد الغني منير; born 13 September 1992) is a Qatari footballer. He currently plays for Al-Wakrah as a winger.

External links
 

1992 births
Living people
Qatari footballers
Al-Gharafa SC players
Al Kharaitiyat SC players
Al-Wakrah SC players
Qatar Stars League players
Association football wingers